Julio Ulises Terra Guerra (1920 - 31 October 1985) was a Uruguayan football defender. He played in one match for the Uruguay national football team in 1947. He was also part of Uruguay's squad for the 1947 South American Championship.

Career
Terra began playing football in Uruguay with River Plate de Montevideo. He had a brief spell in the Argentina Primera Division with San Lorenzo de Almagro during 1948, before moving to Colombia where he would finish his career.

In 1950, Terra joined Cúcuta Deportivo, the club where he spent most of his remaining career and where he would become the oldest player in Colombian league history at the age of 45 years and 5 months. Terra also played for Atlético Nacional and Independiente Medellín. In 1954, he won the Colombian league with Atlético Nacional.

Terra played for the Uruguay national football team in the 1947 South American Championship.

Personal
Terra died at his home in Cúcuta, Colombia at age 63.

References

External links

1985 deaths
Uruguayan footballers
Uruguay international footballers
Club Atlético River Plate (Montevideo) players
San Lorenzo de Almagro footballers
Cúcuta Deportivo footballers
Atlético Nacional footballers
Independiente Medellín footballers
1920 births
Association football defenders